A national dish is a culinary dish that is strongly associated with a particular country. A dish can be considered a national dish for a variety of reasons:
 It is a staple food, made from a selection of locally available foodstuffs that can be prepared in a distinctive way, such as fruits de mer, served along the west coast of France.
 It contains a particular ingredient that is produced locally, such as the South American paprika grown in the European Pyrenees.
 It is served as a festive culinary tradition that forms part of a cultural heritage—for example, barbecues at summer camp or fondue at dinner parties—or as part of a religious practice, such as Korban Pesach or Iftar celebrations.
 It has been promoted as a national dish, by the country itself, such as the promotion of fondue as a national dish of Switzerland by the Swiss Cheese Union (Schweizerische Käseunion) in the 1930s.

National dishes are part of a nation's identity and self-image. During the age of European empire-building, nations would develop a national cuisine to distinguish themselves from their rivals.

According to Zilkia Janer, a lecturer on Latin American culture at Hofstra University, it is impossible to choose a single national dish, even unofficially, for countries such as Mexico, China or India because of their diverse ethnic populations, cultures, and cuisines. Furthermore, because national dishes are so interwoven into a nation's sense of identity, strong emotions and conflicts can arise when trying to choose a country's national dish.

Latin American dishes
In Latin America, dishes may be claimed or designated as a "plato nacional", although in many cases, recipes transcend national borders with only minor variations. Preparations of ceviche are endemic in Peru and Ecuador, while a thin cut of beef known as matambre is considered close to being a national dish in Paraguay. Stews of meat, plantains, and root vegetables are the platos nacionales of several countries in Central America, South America, and the Caribbean: Colombian ajiaco, as well as the sancocho of the Dominican Republic, Colombia, and Panama, are examples of platos nacionales. Janer (2008) observes that this sharing of the same plato nacional by different countries calls into question the idea that every country has a unique national dish that is special to that country; she states that cuisine does not respect national and geopolitical borders.

The identification of Latin American national dishes is stronger among expatriate communities in North America. In Latin American countries, the plato nacional is usually part of the cuisine of rural and peasant communities, and not necessarily part of the everyday cuisine of city dwellers. In expatriate communities, the dish is strongly reclaimed in order to retain the sense of national identity and ties to one's homeland, and is proudly served in homes and restaurants. By this show of national identity, the community can resist social pressures that push for homogenization of many ethnically and culturally diverse communities into a single all-encompassing group identity, such as Latino or Hispanic American.

By country

This is not a definitive list of national dishes, but rather a list of some foods that have been suggested to be national dishes.

A

 Afghanistan: Kabuli palaw
 Albania: Tavë kosi, Flia
 Algeria: Couscous, Rechta
 Andorra: Escudella i carn d'olla
 Angola: Moamba de galinha
 Argentina: Asado, empanada, matambre, Locro
 Armenia: Khorovats, Harisa (not to be confused with the North African pepper paste harissa)
 Australia: Roast lamb, meat pie, pavlova, Vegemite on toast
 Austria: Wiener schnitzel
 Azerbaijan: Dolma

B

 Bahamas: Crack conch with peas and rice
 Bahrain: Kabsa
 Bangladesh: Rice and fish (particularly ilish)
 Barbados: Cou-cou and flying fish
Belarus: Draniki
 Belgium: Frites (particularly served with mussels or steak), carbonade flamande, Waterzooi, chocolate mousse
 Bhutan: Ema datshi
 Bolivia: Salteñas
 Bosnia and Herzegovina: Bosnian pot, Ćevapi
 Botswana: Seswaa
 Brazil: Feijoada
 Brunei: Ambuyat
 Bulgaria: Shopska salad
 Burundi: Boko Boko

C

 Cambodia: Fish amok, num banhchok, samlar kako
 Cameroon: Ndolé
 Canada: Poutine, Kraft Dinner, Nanaimo bar, Butter tarts
 Chile: Empanada, Pastel de choclo, marraqueta.
 China: Peking duck, luosifen, crayfish Hot pot, dumpling, malaxiangguo, Dim sum, Kaolengmian, Tanghulu
 Colombia: Ajiaco, arepa Bandeja paisa
 Comoros: Langouste a la vanille (Vanilla Lobster)
 Democratic Republic of the Congo: Poulet à la Moambé
 Republic of the Congo: Poulet Moambé
 Costa Rica: Casado, Chifrijo (chicharrón or deep fried seasoned pork pieces) served with beans, usually red or black beans (frijoles in spanish there comes the name Chifrijo; CHI from Chicharrón and FRIJO from frijoles), white rice and pico de gallo. Optionally, it may be served with avocado and/or corn chips, Gallo Pinto, Olla de Carne  (stewed beef soup with a variety of vegetables).
 Croatia: Zagorski štrukli
 Cuba: Ropa vieja
 Cyprus: Souvla, Kleftiko, Trachanás
 Czech Republic: Vepřo-knedlo-zelo (Roast pork with dumplings and sauerkraut), svíčková

D

 Denmark: Stegt Flæsk, Smørrebrød
 Dominica: Mountain chicken (historical), Callaloo
 Dominican Republic: La bandera (rice, beans and meat)

E
 Ecuador: Encebollado, Guatitas, Fanesca
 Egypt: Ful medames, kushari, molokhiya, taʿamiya
 El Salvador: Pupusa
 Eritrea: Zigini with injera
 Estonia: Kama
 Ethiopia: Doro wat with injera

F

 Fiji: Fiji Kokoda (Fijian Ceviche)
 Finland: rye bread Lohikeitto
 France: Pot-au-feu, Beef bourguignon, Blanquette de veau, Steak frites, Baguette, Crêpe, Crème caramel, Poule au pot (historical)

G
 Gabon: Poulet Nyembwe
 The Gambia: Domoda
 Georgia: Khachapuri
 Germany: Schnitzel, Schweinshaxe, Bratwurst, Sauerbraten, Döner kebab, Currywurst, Eisbein with sauerkraut
 Greece: Horiatiki, Moussaka, Fasolada Souvlaki, Gyros, Magiritsa, Kokoretsi
 Grenada: Oil down
 Guatemala: Pepián
 Guyana: Pepperpot and Chicken curry

H

 Haiti: Griot, Soup joumou
 Hungary: Gulyásleves
 Honduras: Baleada

I

 Iceland: Lamb, Hákarl
 India: Due to its diverse culture and cuisine, India does not have a specific national dish. Rather, individual regions of India have their typical regional dishes. There were rumours that the government of India was planning on designating khichdi as a national dish but it was later denied by the government.
 Indonesia: Nasi goreng, Tumpeng, Satay, Soto, Rendang, Gado gado
 Iran: Abgoosht, Chelo kabab, Ghormeh sabzi Fesenjan
 Iraq: Masgouf, Dolma, Iraqi Kebab, Quzi
 Ireland: Breakfast roll, Irish stew
 Israel: Falafel (served in pita), Israeli salad, Shakshouka, Meorav Yerushalmi
 Italy: Pasta, pizza, risotto
 Ivory Coast: Atcheke

J

 Jamaica: Ackee and Saltfish, Jerk chicken
 Japan: Sushi, Japanese curry, Ramen, Tempura, Wagashi
 Jordan: Mansaf

K

 Kazakhstan: Beshbarmak
 Kenya: Ugali with sukuma wiki, Githeri, chapati, Nyama choma
 Korea, North: Raengmyŏn, kimchi
 Korea, South: Kimchi, Bulgogi, Bibimbap, Jajangmyeon, Bingsu
 Kosovo: Flia
 Kyrgyzstan: Beshbarmak

L

 Laos: Larb/Laap, sticky rice, Tam Mak Hoong
 Latvia: Layered rye bread, sklandrausis, Jāņi cheese
 Lebanon: Kibbeh, Tabbouleh
 Lithuania: Cepelinai, Šaltibarščiai
 Liechtenstein: Käsknöpfle
 Luxembourg: Judd mat Gaardebounen

M

 Madagascar: Romazava
 Malawi: Chambo with nshima
 Malaysia: Nasi lemak, Satay
 Malta: Stuffat tal-fenek
 Mauritius: Dholl puri (flatbread stuffed with lentils)
 Mexico: Taco, Mole poblano, Chiles en nogada
 Monaco: Barbagiuan
 Montenegro: Njeguški pršut
 Morocco: Couscous, Tagine
 Myanmar: Mohinga, Lahpet thoke

N

 Nepal: Dal bhat, Momo cha
 Netherlands: Stamppot, soused herring with onion and pickles
 New Zealand: Meat pie, bacon and egg pie, lamb, Pavlova
 Nicaragua: Gallo Pinto, Nacatamal, Vigorón
 Niger: Dambou 
 Nigeria: Tuwo shinkafa, Jollof rice, Pounded Yam and Egusi soup
 North Macedonia: Tavče Gravče, Šopska Salata
 Norway: Fårikål

O
 Oman: Shuwa

P

 Pakistan: Biryani, Nihari, Gulab jamun
 Palestine: Maqluba, Musakhan, falafel
 Panama: Sancocho
 Peru: Ceviche
 Philippines: Adobo, Sinigang, Sisig, Pancit, Halo-halo
 Poland: Bigos, Pierogi, Kotlet schabowy, Barszcz, Rosół
 Portugal: Bacalhau, Caldo verde, cozido à portuguesa, Pastel de Belem, Sardinha Assada (Grilled Sardines)

Q
 Qatar: Machboos

R
 Romania: Mămăligă, Sarmale, Mici
 Russia: Borscht, Shchi, Kasha, Pelmeni, Pirozhki, Bliny, Oladyi, Sour cabbage, Bublik, Baranki, Karavai, Vareniki, Rassolnik, Pryanik

S

 Saudi Arabia: Kabsa, Saleeg
 Senegal: Thieboudienne
 Serbia: Ćevapčići, Pljeskavica, Gibanica (pastry), Karađorđeva steak, Sarma
 Singapore: Chilli crab, Hainanese chicken rice, Hokkien mee
 Slovakia: Bryndzové halušky
 Slovenia: Buckwheat dumplings (particularly štruklji),Idrijski žlikrofi
 Somalia: Bariis Iskukaris
 South Africa: Bobotie
 Spain: Tortilla de patatas
 Catalonia: Pa amb tomaquet
 Galicia: Polbo á feira
 Valencia: Paella
 Sri Lanka: Rice and curry, Kottu
 Suriname: Pom
 Sweden: Köttbullar, Kräftskiva, Surströmming, Ostkaka
 Switzerland: Fondue, Muesli, Raclette, Rösti (core national dishes). Other dishes: Cervelat (national sausage), Zürcher Geschnetzeltes
 Syria: Kibbeh

T

 Taiwan: Beef noodle soup, Minced pork rice
 Tajikistan: Osh Palov, Qurutob
 Tanzania: Chipsi mayai
 Thailand: Pad Thai, Tom yum,  Som tam
 Trinidad and Tobago: Callaloo, Doubles, Pelau
 Tobago: Curry Crab and Dumplings
 Tunisia: Kosksi, Brik/Bric
 Turkey: Kuru fasulye with pilaf/pilau, Kebap, Baklava, Simit

U

 Uganda: Matooke
 Ukraine: Borscht, Varenyky
 United Arab Emirates: Khuzi
 United Kingdom: Fish and chips, Chicken tikka masala, Full breakfast (regional variations)
 Cornwall: Cornish pasty
 England: Sunday roast (especially roast beef), pudding (particularly Christmas plum pudding)
 Northern Ireland: Ulster fry
 Scotland: Haggis
 Wales: Cawl
 United States: There is no officially designated food due to its diverse culture and cuisine, but various authors have named dishes such as apple pie, hamburger, hot dog, turkey, mashed potatoes and gravy (historical)
 American Samoa: Palusami
 Guam: Kelaguen, Spam
 Northern Mariana Islands: Kelaguen
 Puerto Rico: Lechon, Mofongo
 United States Virgin Islands: Funji
 Uruguay: Chivito
 Uzbekistan: Osh

V
 Vanuatu: Laplap
 Venezuela: Pabellón criollo
 Vietnam: Phở, Hủ tiếu, Bún bò Huế, Bún riêu, Bún chả, Bún thịt nướng, Mì Quảng, Cơm tấm, Bánh chưng, Bánh giầy, Bánh mì, Bánh cuốn, Bánh xèo, Gỏi cuốn, Chả giò

Y
 Yemen: Saltah

Z
 Zambia: Nshima
 Zimbabwe: Sadza

Gallery

Drink

National drinks

A national drink is a distinct beverage that is strongly associated with a particular country, and can be part of their national identity and self-image. National drinks fall into two categories, alcoholic and non-alcoholic. An alcoholic national drink is sometimes a national liquor drank straight/neat (as in the case of whiskey in Ireland), but is most often a mixed drink (e.g., caipirinhas in Brazil and pisco sours in Peru and Chile), or beer or wine. Examples of non-alcoholic national drinks include tea for China, Coca-Cola for the US, lassis for India, mate for Uruguay, and kompot for East European nations.

See also
 Index of sociology of food articles
 Traditional food

References

Cuisine
 
 
Lists of foods